Femke Kooijman (born 8 March 1978) is a retired Dutch field hockey player, who played for the Dutch hockey team HC Klein Zwitserland and the Netherlands women's national field hockey team. She earned a total number of 42 caps from 2002 to 2004.

References

1978 births
Living people
Dutch female field hockey players
Sportspeople from Leiden
HC Klein Zwitserland players
HGC players
20th-century Dutch women